Albert Heyche (born 29 June 1949) is a Belgian rower. He competed in the men's double sculls event at the 1972 Summer Olympics.

References

External links
 
 

1949 births
Living people
Belgian male rowers
Olympic rowers of Belgium
Rowers at the 1972 Summer Olympics
Place of birth missing (living people)